Kota Marudu Talantang is an Austronesian language of Sabah, Malaysia.

References

Dusunic languages
Endangered Austronesian languages
Languages of Malaysia